Karen L. Wooley is an American polymer chemist.  She is a Distinguished Professor at Texas A&M University whose research focuses on developing novel polymers and nanostructured materials.

Early life and education 
Wooley was born and raised in Oakridge, Oregon, a small logging community in the mountains of Oregon. She received her B.Sc. in Chemistry from Oregon State University in 1988, and a Ph.D. in Polymer/Organic Chemistry from Cornell University in 1993 under the guidance of Jean Fréchet.

Career 
Wooley is internationally recognized as a leader in the area of multifunctional macromolecules (polymers and related materials). Wooley has changed the way modern chemists think about the design, synthesis, and functionalization of organic polymers. She is credited with bringing a rational designed-based synthetic approach to the field of polymer chemistry; an approach traditionally reserved for small molecule synthetic targets like natural products. She is a member of the American Academy of Arts & Sciences, the National Academy of Inventors, and the National Academy of Sciences.

Wooley’s independent career in academia began in 1993 as an Assistant Professor in the Department of Chemistry at Washington University in St. Louis (WUSTL) where she was promoted to Full Professor in 1999 and installed as the James S. McDonnell Distinguished University Professor in Arts & Sciences (an endowed Professorship now held by Rodolfo Manuelli in the Department of Economics). Wooley also was affiliated with the Department of Radiology at the WUSTL School of Medicine through a joint appointment granted in 2007 as part of her active collaborations in the area of radiotherapeutics with the late Michael Welch (1939–2012). In 2009, Wooley was recruited to Texas A&M University where she holds the W. T. Doherty-Welch Chair in Chemistry and is a University Distinguished Professor and Presidential Impact Fellow at Texas A&M University, with appointments in the Departments of Chemistry, Chemical Engineering and Materials Science & Engineering. She also serves as Director of the Laboratory for Synthetic-Biologic Interactions.

Wooley's research interests include the synthesis and characterization of degradable polymers derived from natural products, unique macromolecular architectures and complex polymer assemblies, and the design and development of well-defined nanostructured materials.  She has designed synthetic strategies to harness the rich compositional, regiochemical and stereochemical complexity of natural products for the construction of hydrolytically-degradable polymers, which have impact toward sustainability, reduction of reliance on petrochemicals, and production of biologically-beneficial and environmentally-benign natural products upon degradation – these materials are expected to impact the global issue of plastic pollution and address challenges resulting from climate change. Wooley's research team is actively engaged in creative approaches to materials for nanomedicine applications, degradable polymers from natural resources, coatings for marine antifouling, advanced photoresist materials for the microelectronics industry, hybrid magnetic nanomaterials for environmental remediation, and other projects of fundamental and applied nature.

In 2017, Wooley helped establish biodegradable plastics development company Teysha Technologies. Wooley, alongside the team at Teysha, has been working to develop biodegradable plastics from biomass stock. These plastics can be tuned to decompose within set timescales. The goal of the project is to develop a new, general purpose, seawater soluble plastics, to help address the problem of plastic pollution in the oceans. She is the co-founder and President of Sugar Plastics, LLC.

Awards 

Wooley received the American Chemical Society Award in Polymer Chemistry (2014), the Royal Society of Chemistry Royal Society of Chemistry Centenary Prize (2014), and election as a Fellow of the American Academy of Arts and Sciences (2015), National Academy of Inventors (2019), American Association for the Advancement of Science (2020), American Institute for Medical and Biological Engineering (2020), and National Academy of Sciences (2020).  Most recently, she was named as the 2021 Southeastern Conference (SEC) Professor of the Year.  Wooley has served on the technical advisory boards and served in consulting capacities for several companies, from Fortune 500 companies to start-ups, and law firms.

References

External links 
 Wooley Research Group

Year of birth missing (living people)
Living people
21st-century American chemists
Place of birth missing (living people)
Texas A&M University faculty
Oregon State University alumni
Women chemists
Members of the United States National Academy of Sciences